Fennel (Foeniculum vulgare) is a flowering plant species in the carrot family. It is a hardy, perennial herb with yellow flowers and feathery leaves. It is indigenous to the shores of the Mediterranean but has become widely naturalized in many parts of the world, especially on dry soils near the sea-coast and on riverbanks.

It is a highly flavorful herb used in cooking and, along with the similar-tasting anise, is one of the primary ingredients of absinthe. Florence fennel or finocchio is a selection with a swollen, bulb-like stem base that is used as a vegetable.

Description

Botany 
Foeniculum vulgare is a perennial herb. Its leaves are similar to those of dill, but thinner.

Since the seed in the fruit is attached to the pericarp, the whole fruit is often mistakenly called "seed."

Chemistry 
The aromatic character of fennel fruits derives from volatile oils imparting mixed aromas, including trans-anethole and estragole (resembling liquorice), fenchone (mint and camphor), limonene, 1-octen-3-ol (mushroom). Other phytochemicals found in fennel fruits include polyphenols, such as rosmarinic acid and luteolin, among others in minor content.

F. vulgare essential oil also has non-food uses. Pavela et al 2016 find the EO to be insecticidal.

Similar species 

Some plants in the Apiaceae family are poisonous and often difficult to identify.

Dill, coriander, ajwain, and caraway are similar-looking herbs but shorter-growing than fennel, reaching only . Dill has thread-like, feathery leaves and yellow flowers; coriander and caraway have white flowers and finely divided leaves (though not as fine as dill or fennel) and are also shorter-lived (being annual or biennial plants). The superficial similarity in appearance between these seeds may have led to a sharing of names and etymology, as in the case of meridian fennel, a term for caraway.

Giant fennel (Ferula communis) is a large, coarse plant with a pungent aroma, which grows wild in the Mediterranean region and is only occasionally grown in gardens elsewhere. Other species of the genus Ferula are also called giant fennel, but they are not culinary herbs.

In North America, fennel may be found growing in the same habitat and alongside natives osha (Ligusticum porteri) and Lomatium species, useful medicinal relatives in the parsley family.

Most Lomatium species have yellow flowers like fennel, but some are white-flowered and resemble poison hemlock. Lomatium is an important historical food plant of Native Americans known as 'biscuit root'.  Most Lomatium spp. have finely divided, hairlike leaves; their roots have a delicate rice-like odor, unlike the musty odor of hemlock. Lomatium species prefer dry, rocky soils devoid of organic material.

Etymology 

Cultivation 

Fennel is widely cultivated, both in its native range and elsewhere, for its edible, strongly flavored leaves and fruits. Its aniseed or liquorice flavor comes from anethole, an aromatic compound also found in anise and star anise, and its taste and aroma are similar to theirs, though usually not as strong.

Florence fennel (Foeniculum vulgare Azoricum Group; syn. F. vulgare var. azoricum) is a cultivar group with inflated leaf bases which form a bulb-like structure. It is of cultivated origin, and has a mild anise-like flavor but is sweeter and more aromatic. Florence fennel plants are smaller than the wild type. Several cultivars of Florence fennel are also known by several other names, notably the Italian name finocchio. In North American supermarkets, it is often mislabeled as "anise."

Foeniculum vulgare 'Purpureum' or 'Nigra', "bronze-leaved" fennel, is widely available as a decorative garden plant.

Fennel has become naturalized along roadsides, in pastures, and in other open sites in many regions, including northern Europe, the United States, southern Canada, and much of Asia and Australia. It propagates well by both root crown and seed and is considered an invasive species and a weed in Australia and the United States. It can drastically alter the composition and structure of many plant communities, including grasslands, coastal scrub, riparian, and wetland communities. It appears to do this by outcompeting native species for light, nutrients, and water and perhaps by exuding allelopathic substances that inhibit the growth of other plants. In western North America, fennel can be found from the coastal and inland wildland-urban interface east into hill and mountain areas, excluding desert habitats. On Santa Cruz Island, California for example, fennel has achieved 50 to 90% absolute cover.

Production 

As grouped by the United Nations Food and Agriculture Organization, production data for fennel are combined with similar spices – anise, star anise, and coriander. In 2014, India produced 60% of the world output of fennel, with China and Bulgaria as leading secondary producers (table).

Uses 

Fennel was prized by the ancient Greeks and Romans, who used it as medicine, food, and insect repellent. Fennel tea was believed to give courage to the warriors before battle. According to Greek mythology, Prometheus used a giant stalk of fennel to carry fire from Mount Olympus to Earth. Emperor Charlemagne required the cultivation of fennel on all imperial farms.

Florence fennel is one of the three main herbs used in the preparation of absinthe, an alcoholic mixture which originated as a medicinal elixir in Europe and became, by the late 19th century, a popular alcoholic drink in France and other countries. Fennel fruit is a common and traditional spice in flavored Scandinavian brännvin (a loosely defined group of distilled spirits, which include akvavit). Fennel is also featured in the Chinese Materia Medica for its medicinal functions.

Nutrition 

A raw fennel bulb (235 g) consists of 212 g of water, 2.91 g of protein, 0.47 g of fat, and 17.2 g of carbohydrate (including 7.28 g of dietary fiber and 9.24 g of sugars), providing a total of 72.8 Calories (kcal) of energy.  The 235g bulb provides 115 mg of calcium, 1.72 mg of iron, 40 mg of magnesium, 188 mg of phosphorus, 973 mg of potassium, 122 mg of sodium, trace amounts of zinc, copper, and selenium, 28.2 mg of vitamin C, as well as choline, several B vitamins, folate, beta-carotene, lutein, zeaxanthin, vitamin E, and vitamin K.

Dried fennel fruits are typically used as a spice and usually are eaten only in minute quantities. A 100-gram reference amount of fennel fruits provides  of food energy and is a rich source (20% or more of the Daily Value, DV) of protein, dietary fiber, B vitamins and several dietary minerals, especially calcium, iron, magnesium and manganese, all of which exceed 100% DV (table). Fennel fruits are 52% carbohydrates (including 40% dietary fiber), 15% fat, 16% protein, and 9% water (table).

Cuisine 
The bulb, foliage, and fruits of the fennel plant are used in many of the culinary traditions of the world. The small flowers of wild fennel (known as fennel "pollen") are the most potent form of fennel, but also the most expensive.
Dried fennel fruit is an aromatic, anise-flavored spice, brown or green when fresh, slowly turning a dull grey as the fruit ages. For cooking, green fruits are optimal. The leaves are delicately flavored and similar in shape to dill. The bulb is a crisp vegetable that can be sautéed, stewed, braised, grilled, or eaten raw. Tender young leaves are used for garnishes, as a salad, to add flavor to salads, to flavor sauces to be served with puddings, and in soups and fish sauce. Both the inflated leaf bases and the tender young shoots can be eaten like celery.

Fennel fruits are sometimes confused with those of anise, which are similar in taste and appearance, though smaller. Fennel is also a flavoring in some natural toothpastes. The fruits are used in cookery and sweet desserts.

Many cultures in India, Afghanistan, Iran, and the Middle East use fennel fruits in cooking. In Iraq, fennel seeds are used as an ingredient in nigella-flavored breads. It is one of the most important spices in Kashmiri cuisine and Gujarati cooking. In Indian cuisine, whole fennel seeds and fennel powder are used as a spice in various sweet and savory dishes. It is an essential ingredient of the Assamese/Bengali/Oriya spice mixture panch phoron and in Chinese five-spice powders. In many parts of India, roasted fennel fruits are consumed as mukhwas, an after-meal digestive and breath freshener (saunf), or candied as comfit. Fennel seeds are also often used as an ingredient in paan, a breath freshener most popularly consumed in India.

Fennel leaves are used in some parts of India as leafy green vegetables either by themselves or mixed with other vegetables, cooked to be served and consumed as part of a meal. In Syria and Lebanon, the young leaves are used to make a special kind of egg omelette (along with onions and flour) called .

Many egg, fish, and other dishes employ fresh or dried fennel leaves. Florence fennel is a key ingredient in some Italian salads, or it can be braised and served as a warm side dish. It may be blanched or marinated, or cooked in risotto.

Fennel fruits are the primary flavor component in Italian sausage. In Spain, the stems of the fennel plant are used in the preparation of pickled eggplants, . An herbal tea or tisane can be made from fennel.

On account of its aromatic properties, fennel fruit forms one of the ingredients of the well-known compound liquorice powder. In the Indian subcontinent, fennel fruits are eaten raw, sometimes with a sweetener.

In Israel, fennel salad is made of chopped fennel bulbs flavored with salt, black pepper, lemon juice, parsley, olive oil, and sometimes sumac.

Culture 

The Greek name for fennel is marathon or marathos, and the place of the famous battle of Marathon literally means a plain with fennel. In Hesiod's Theogony, Prometheus steals the ember of fire from the gods in a hollow fennel stalk.

As Old English , fennel is one of the nine plants invoked in the pagan Anglo-Saxon Nine Herbs Charm, recorded in the 10th century.

In the 15th century, Portuguese settlers on Madeira noticed the abundance of wild fennel and used the Portuguese word funcho (fennel) and the suffix  to form the name of a new town, Funchal.

Henry Wadsworth Longfellow's 1842 poem "The Goblet of Life" repeatedly refers to the plant and mentions its purported ability to strengthen eyesight:

 Above the lower plants, it towers,
 The Fennel with its yellow flowers;
 And in an earlier age than ours
 Was gifted with the wondrous powers
 Lost vision to restore.

References

External links 
 
 
 

Absinthe
Butterfly food plants
Edible Apiaceae
Edible nuts and seeds
Herbs
Indian spices
Leaf vegetables
Perennial vegetables
Spices
Mediterranean cuisine